Melanie is a feminine given name derived from the Greek μελανία (melania), "blackness" and that from μέλας (melas), meaning "dark". Borne in its Latin form by two saints, Melania the Elder and her granddaughter Melania the Younger, the name was introduced to England by the Normans in its French form Melanie. However, the name only became common in English usage in the 1930s because of the popularity of Margaret Mitchell's 1936 novel Gone with the Wind and its 1939 film adaptation, as one of the novel's main characters was named Melanie Hamilton. The name's popularity increased until the 1970s, since remaining constant. Melanie was the 80th most popular name for girls born in the United States in 1957 and, as Mélanie, it was the 86th most popular name for girls born in France in 2004.

People named Melanie
 Melanie Blake, English talent agent and author
 Melanie Blatt (born 1975), British singer, member of All Saints
 Melanie le Brocquy (1919–2018), Irish sculptor 
 Melanie Brown (Mel B) (born 1975), British singer and member of the Spice Girls
 Melanie Chisholm (Melanie C) (born 1974), British singer and member of the Spice Girls
 Melanie Clewlow (born 1976), English hockey defender
 Melanie Counsell (born 1964), Welsh filmmaker, installation artist and sculptor
 Melanie Doane (born 1967), Canadian singer
 Melanie Fiona (born 1983), Canadian singer
 Melanie Fontana (born 1986), American singer
 Melanie Wade Goodwin (1970–2020), American politician
 Melanie Griffith (born 1957), American actress
 Melanie Hahnemann (1800–1878), homeopath
 Melanie Hall (1970–2004), English murder victim
 Melanie Hall (basketball), Australian athlete
 Sister Mary Melanie Holliday (1850-1939), American Catholic nun
 Melanie Jans (born 1973), Canadian squash player 
 Melanie Johnson (born 1955), British politician
 Melanie Klaffner (born 1990), Austrian tennis player 
 Melanie Klein (1882–1960), Austrian-born British psychoanalyst
 Melanie Kreis (born 1971), German businesswoman
 Melanie Lambert (born 1974), American adagio and pair skater
 Melanie Leslie (born 1961), dean of the Benjamin N. Cardozo School of Law
 Melanie Lynskey (born 1977), New Zealand actress
 Melanie Martinez (born 1972), American actress
 Melanie Martinez (singer) (born 1995), American singer-songwriter
 Melanie Mayron (born 1952), American actress
 Melanie McFadyean, British journalist
 Melanie McGuire (born 1972), American criminal who murdered her husband, dismembered his body and put it into suitcases
 Melanie Merkosky (born 1986), Canadian actress
 Melanie Nolan (born 1960), New Zealand historian 
 Melanie Phillips (born 1951), British journalist
 Melanie Safka (born 1947), American singer/songwriter born Melanie Anne Safka, professionally known as Melanie
 Melanie South (born 1986), British tennis player
 Melanie Stabel (born 1999), German sport shooter
 Melanie Stansbury (born 1979), American politician and scientist  
 Melanie Thornton (1967–2001), American pop singer
 Melanie Weisner (born 1986), American professional poker player

People named Mélanie
Mélanie is a feminine French given name. Notable people with the name include:
Mélanie Bernier (b. 1985), French actress
Mélanie Bonis (1858–1937), French composer 
Mélanie Calvat (1831–1904), French nun
Mélanie Cohl (b. 1982), Belgian singer 
Mélanie Doutey, French actress
Mélanie Laurent (b. 1983), French actress and director
Mélanie de Pourtalès (1836–1914), French salonnière and courtier
Mélanie Turgeon (b. 1976), Canadian skier

Fictional characters
 Melanie Barnett, a character from the television series The Game
 Melanie Bush, a character in the television series Doctor Who
 Melanie Hamilton, a character in the novel Gone with the Wind
 Melanie Jonas, a former character on the American soap opera Days of Our Lives
 Melanie Marcus, a character in the television series Queer as Folk
 Melanie Stryder, a character from the book The Host by Stephenie Meyer
 Melanie Walker, a character from Batman Beyond

See also
Melania
Mélanie (album), album by Céline Dion

References

English feminine given names
Given names of Greek language origin
Scottish feminine given names
Irish feminine given names
French feminine given names
German feminine given names
Dutch feminine given names
Welsh feminine given names